The Ministry of Economy of the Republic of Belarus or Minekonomiki (Минэкономики) is the Belarusian government ministry which oversees the economic policy of Belarus.

The current Minister of Economy is Aleksandr Viktorovich Chervyakov, and has held the post since 2020.

History 
The Ministry of Economy was created by the resolution of the Council of Ministers of the Republic of Belarus on March 14, 1994, on the basis of the State Committee of the Republic of Belarus for Economics and Planning of the former Byelorussian Soviet Socialist Republic. On May 24, 1994, the Council of Ministers approved the regulation on the ministry, and on October 6, 1995, it also approved a new regulation. On July 2, 1997, the Council of Ministers adjusted the functions of the ministry, entrusting it with some tasks in the field of energy.

In 2021, in honor of the 100th anniversary of the founding of the Belarusian economic bodies, the emblem and flag of the Ministry of Economy was established, with the corresponding decree on official heraldic symbols being signed by President of Belarus Alexander Lukashenko. A jubilee medal was also established.

Ministers of Economy 
 Sergey Ling (April 1994 - March 1995)
 Grigory Badei (March 1995 - August 1996)
 Vladimir Shimov (November 1996 - June 2002)
 Andrei Kobyakov July 2002 - December 2003
 Nikolai Zaichenko (December 2003 - December 2009)
 Nikolai Snopkov (December 2009 - December 2014)
 Vladimir Zinovsky (December 2014 - August 2018)
 Dmitry Krutoy (August 18, 2018 - November 29, 2019)
 Aleksandr Chervyakov (since January 4, 2020)

Ministers of Finance 
Stepan Yanchuk, (1991-1994)
Nikolay Rumas, (1994-1995)
Pawl Dzik, (1995-1997)
, (1997-2008)
, (2008-2014)
, (2014-2018)
, (2018-2020)
, (since 5 June 2020)

Structure 
The structure of the Ministry as of August 2019:

 Leadership
 Minister - Aleksandr Chervyakov
 First Deputy Minister - Yuri Chebotar
 Deputy Minister - Elena Perminova
 Deputy Minister - Dmitry Yaroshevich
 Deputy Minister - Anzhelika Nikitina
 Deputy Minister - Sergey Mityansky
 Department of Entrepreneurship
 Reorganization and Bankruptcy Department
 Main Directorate of Investment Policy
 Main Department of Macroeconomic Analysis and Forecasting
 Main Department of Methodology and Coordination of State Programs
 Main Department of Regional Development and Property Relations
 Main Directorate for Strategic Development and International Cooperation
 Main Directorate for Sustainable Development
 Main Department of Industrial Economics
 General Directorate of Economic Integration
 Information Technology Department
 Development Infrastructure Department
 Department for Mobilization Preparation of the Economy
 Foreign Trade Forecasting Department
 Department of the Economy of the Social Sphere
 Construction Economics Department
 Department of Economics of Innovation
 Department of International Technical Assistance

The following organizations are also subordinate to the Ministry:

 State Scientific Institution "Research Economic Institute of the Ministry of Economy of the Republic of Belarus"
 Belarusian Fund for Financial Support of Entrepreneurs
 RUE "Information Center of the Ministry of Economy of the Republic of Belarus"
 State Institution "National Agency for Investments and Privatization"
 Territorial Reorganization and Bankruptcy Authorities

References 

Government ministries of Belarus
Finance
Belarus